IROC IV was the fourth year of IROC competition, which took place over three weekends in 1976 and 1977. It saw the use of the Chevrolet Camaro in all races, and the schedule was held over in its entirety from IROC III. A. J. Foyt won the championship and $50,000 without winning a race for the second year in a row.

The roster of drivers and final points standings were as follows:

Race results

Michigan International Speedway, Race One

 Buddy Baker
 Johnny Rutherford
 A. J. Foyt
 Jody Scheckter
 Al Unser
 Richard Petty
 Gordon Johncock
 Al Holbert
 Cale Yarborough
 David Pearson
 Bobby Unser
 James Hunt

Riverside International Raceway, Race Two

 Bobby Unser
 David Pearson
 Richard Petty
 Al Holbert
 Johnny Rutherford
 Buddy Baker
 Al Unser
 A. J. Foyt
 Cale Yarborough
 Gordon Johncock
 Jody Scheckter

Riverside International Raceway, Race Three

 Cale Yarborough
 A. J. Foyt
 Jody Scheckter
 Bobby Unser
 Al Unser
 Al Holbert
 Johnny Rutherford
 Buddy Baker
 Richard Petty
 Gordon Johncock
 David Pearson

Daytona International Speedway, Race Four

 Cale Yarborough
 A. J. Foyt
 Bobby Unser
 Richard Petty
 Johnny Rutherford
 David Pearson
 Al Holbert
 Buddy Baker
 Al Unser

References

External links
IROC IV History - IROC Website

International Race of Champions
1976 in American motorsport
1977 in American motorsport